On Divine Winds is the second album from Hail of Bullets, an old school death metal band formed by current and former members of Asphyx and Gorefest. On Divine Winds continued the band's focus upon the Second World War, this time focusing upon the Pacific Campaign.  The album title is a reference to the English translation of "Kamikaze" and was produced by Dan Swanö.

Background
Drummer Ed Warby said that the main difference between the first album and On Divine Winds was that the band "semi-subconsciously" incorporated more melody into the music.   Warby attributed this emphasis on melody to the subject matter of the album:

Track listing
All music and lyrics by Hail of Bullets.

Personnel
Hail of Bullets
Martin van Drunen - vocals
Stephan Gebedi - guitars
Paul Baayens - guitars
Ed Warby - drums
Theo van Eekelen - bass

Technical personnel
Dan Swanö - mixing and mastering
Chris van der Valk - drums and vocal recording
Ed Warby - guitars and bass recording

Design personnel
Mick Koopman - cover art and layout
Daniel Horibogen – photography
Cherie Goewie - photography
Tom Jaschke – photography
Christian Baeriswyl – photography

References

External links
Official website

2010 albums
Hail of Bullets albums
Metal Blade Records albums
Albums produced by Dan Swanö
Concept albums